Super Ma'am (International title: My Teacher, My Hero) is a 2017 Philippine television action fantasy drama series directed by Lord Alvin Madridejos and Albert Langitan. Starring Marian Rivera, this series premiered on GMA Network's GMA Telebabad evening block and worldwide on GMA Pinoy TV on September 18, 2017, replacing Mulawin vs. Ravena and occupying the timeslot of Alyas Robin Hood.

NUTAM (Nationwide Urban Television Audience Measurement) People in Television Homes ratings are provided by AGB Nielsen Philippines while Kantar Media Philippines provide Nationwide ratings (Urban + Rural).

The series ended its 19-week run with 95 episodes. It was replaced by Sherlock Jr. in its timeslot.

Series overview

Episodes

September 2017

October 2017

November 2017

December 2017

January 2018

References

Lists of Philippine drama television series episodes